Imouzzer Ida Ou Tanane (Berber: Imuzzar Ida Utanan) is a small town and rural commune in Agadir-Ida Ou Tanane Prefecture, Souss-Massa, Morocco. At the time of the 2004 census, the commune had a population of 6,351 living in 1,153 households.

References

External links 
 Official Facebook Page

Populated places in Agadir-Ida Ou Tanane Prefecture
Rural communes of Souss-Massa